Tim Siegel may refer to:

 Tim Siegel (One Life to Live), character in American soap opera One Life to Live
 Tim Siegel (tennis) (born 1964), tennis player and coach